The Bazhanov coal mine is a large coal mine located in southeastern Ukraine in Donetsk Oblast, in the industrial city of Makiivka. Bazhanov mine represents one of the largest coal reserve in Ukraine having estimated reserves of 58.7 million tonnes of coal. The annual coal production is around 1.02 million tonnes.

July 2011 mining accident 
On 29 July 2011, an elevator collapse killed 11 miners and seriously injured four others. Hundreds of workers were evacuated from other areas of the mine. The president of Ukraine ordered a government investigation. Ukraine's prime minister attributed the accident to "negligence" and estimated that it would take 16 months to repair damage to the mine. Earlier that same day, Ukraine had experienced another fatal coal mining accident due to an explosion in the Suhodolskaya-Vostochnaya coal mine.

See also
 FC Shakhtar Makiivka
 Coal in Ukraine
 List of mines in Ukraine

References 

Coal mines in Ukraine
Coal mines in the Soviet Union
Economy of Donetsk Oblast
2011 in Ukraine
Coal mining disasters in Ukraine
2011 mining disasters
2011 disasters in Ukraine